Torben Antretter (born January 28, 1992) is a German entrepreneur, economist, and author living in Switzerland.

Career 
After graduating from high school, Antretter studied business administration at the International School of Management and the Westfälische Wilhelms-Universität Münster. In 2017, he founded the LegalTech company RightNow, whose investors include Carsten Maschmeyer and the founders of the hotel search engine Trivago. Antretter received his doctorate (Dr. oec. HSG) from the University of St. Gallen in 2020 with his dissertation entitled "Investment Decisions and Outcomes of Early Stage Investors". Since then, he has been lecturing on "Entrepreneurial Finance" at the University of St.Gallen. In 2020, Antretter was included in the list of "30 under 30" influential entrepreneurs by the U.S. business magazine Forbes. His career and entrepreneurial activities were most recently profiled by Harvard Business School as part of a case study.

Honors 
Forbes Magazine: "30 under 30" in Germany, Austria and Switzerland, 2020.

Publications (selection)

Scientific articles 

 Do algorithms make better - and fairer - investments than angel investors? in: Harvard Business Review, 2020.
 Should business angels diversify their investment portfolios to achieve higher performance? The role of knowledge access through co-investment networks. in: Journal of Business Venturing, vol. 35(5), pp. 1–19, 2020.
 It's a peoples game, isn't it?! A comparison between the investment returns of business angels and machine learning algorithms. in: Entrepreneurship Theory and Practice, vol. 2020(1), pp. 1–38, 2020.
 New venture survival: A review and extension. in: International Journal of Management Reviews, vol. 22(4), pp. 378–407, 2020.
 Predicting new venture survival: A Twitter-based machine learning approach to measuring online legitimacy. in: Journal of Business Venturing Insights, vol. 11(1), pp. 1–8, 2019.

Book Publications 

 Investment Decisions and Outcomes of Early Stage Investors. Dissertation, University of St.Gallen, Difo-Druck Untersiemau, 2020.
 Startup Navigator - Guiding Your Entrepreneurial Journey. McMillan, 2020, .
 Entrepreneurial Finance: The Art and Science of Growing Ventures. Cambridge University Press, 2019. chapter 6: Deal Sourcing and Screening, pp. 148–180.
 Startup Navigator: Das Handbuch. Frankfurter Allgemeine Buch, 2018, .
 Kapitalkostenermittlung als Grauzone wertorientierter Unternehmensführung. Monsenstein & Vannerdat, 2015, .

References 

1992 births
Living people
21st-century German businesspeople
German company founders
German economists
University of St. Gallen alumni